David Abong'o Okello (born 19 September 1986) is a Kenyan international footballer who plays for Tusker as a goalkeeper.

Career
Born in Nairobi, Okello has played club football for Thika United, Sofapaka and Tusker.

He made his international debut for Kenya in 2007.

References

1986 births
Living people
Footballers from Nairobi
Kenyan footballers
Kenya international footballers
Thika United F.C. players
Sofapaka F.C. players
Tusker F.C. players
Kenyan Premier League players
Association football goalkeepers